Southern Metropolitan Region  is one of the eight electoral regions of Victoria, Australia, which elects five members to the Victorian Legislative Council (also referred to as the upper house) by proportional representation. The region was created in 2006 following the 2005 reform of the Victorian Legislative Council.

The region comprises the Legislative Assembly districts of Albert Park, Ashwood, Bentleigh, Brighton, Caulfield, Hawthorn, Kew, Malvern, Oakleigh, Prahran and Sandringham. The region covers most of the wealthiest areas of Melbourne, only a few traditional Labor areas (Oakleigh being the only historically safe Labor seat), and one of the four Greens-held seats in the lower house (Prahran).

Members

Returned MLCs by seat
Seats are allocated by single transferable vote using group voting tickets. Changes in party membership between elections have been omitted for simplicity.

Election results

References

External links
 Southern Metropolitan Region, Victorian Electoral Commission
 Southern Metropolitan Region, Parliament of Victoria

Electoral regions of Victoria (Australia)
Electoral districts and divisions of Greater Melbourne